Frenchport is an unincorporated community in Ouachita County, Arkansas, United States. The Capt. John T. Burkett House, which is listed on the National Register of Historic Places, is located near Frenchport.

References

Unincorporated communities in Ouachita County, Arkansas
Unincorporated communities in Arkansas